Yakusanoikazuchi or ikazuchi is a collective name for the eight kami of thunder in Japanese mythology. Each one represents a different type of storm.

Ikazuchi (雷) literally means thunder in Japanese.

Mythology 
Some tellings say that the eight deities were from the maggots of Izanami's rotting corpse. Many versions of the Nihon Shoki and the Kojiki state that Izanami send the Yomotsu-shikome, 150 warriors, and the eight thunder kami after him.

List 

 Ō-ikazuchi: (Great thunder) both the Kojiki states and the Nihon Shoki state that Ō-ikazuchi came from Izanami's head.
 Hono-ikazuchi: (Fire thunder) Both the Kojiki says that this kami came from Izanami's breasts.
 Kuro-ikazuchi: (Black thunder) The Kojiki says that this deity came from Izanami's belly however, the Nikon Shoki says that Kuro-ikazuchi was in Izanami's rectum.
 Saku-ikazuchi: (Cleaving thunder)
 Waka-ikazuchi: (Young thunder)
 Tsuchi-ikazuchi: (Earth thunder)
 Naru-ikazuchi: (Rumbling thunder)
 Fuchi-ikazuchi: (Couchant thunder)

References 

Japanese mythology
Thunder gods
Japanese deities
Kunitsukami